Jeannette Colombel (30 December 1919 – 12 April 2016) was a French philosopher.

Publications 
 1974 : Les murs de l'école, Christian Bourgois éditeur.
 1980 : Brumes de mémoire, Stock.
 1981 : Sartre ou le parti de vivre, Grasset.
 1985 : Sartre: un homme en situation, Tome I, Hachette.
 1986 : Sartre: une œuvre aux mille têtes, Tome II, Hachette.
 1990 : Les amants de l'ombre, Flammarion.
 1994 : Michel Foucault, la clarté ou la mort, Odile Jacob.
 1997 : La nostalgie de l'espérance, Stock.
 2000 : Jean-Paul Sartre, un homme en situation, LGF.
 2000 : Lettre à Mathilde sur Jean-Paul Sartre, LGF, Le Livre de poche.
 2005 : Silencieuse ritournelle en Corse, Éditions Materia Scritta.

References 

French philosophers
1919 births
2016 deaths